Shiloh Baptist Church may refer to:

in the United States (by state)
 Shiloh Baptist Church disaster, a stampede at a church in Birmingham, Alabama
 Shiloh Baptist Church (Sacramento, California), listed on the National Register of Historic Places (NRHP) in Sacramento County
 Shiloh-Marion Baptist Church and Cemetery, Buena Vista, Georgia, listed on the NRHP in Marion County
 Shiloh Primitive Baptist Church, Brogden, North Carolina, listed on the NRHP in Johnston County
 Mount Shiloh Missionary Baptist Church, New Bern, North Carolina, listed on the NRHP in Craven County
 Shiloh Baptist Church (Cleveland, Ohio), listed on the NRHP in Cuyahoga County
 Shiloh Baptist Church (Columbus, Ohio), listed on the NRHP in Columbus, Ohio
 Shiloh Baptist Church, Chattanooga, Tennessee (now known as First Baptist Church), listed on the NRHP in Hamilton County
 Shiloh Baptist Church (Gregg County, Texas)
 Shiloh Church (Newport, Rhode Island), listed on the NRHP as Shiloh Baptist Church in Newport County
 Shiloh Baptist Church (Old Site), a historic Baptist church in downtown Fredericksburg, Virginia
 Shiloh Baptist Church (Powhatan, Virginia)
 Shiloh Baptist Church (Alexandria, Virginia)
 Shiloh Baptist Church (Washington, D.C.)

See also
Shiloh Church (disambiguation)